Elizabeth Donkin Hospital is a government funded Psychiatric hospital and Rehabilitation Centre situated in Port Elizabeth, Eastern Cape in South Africa.

The hospital departments include a Rehabilitation Centre, Pharmacy, Anti-Retroviral (ARV) treatment for HIV/AIDS, Post Trauma Counseling Services, Occupational Services, Laundry Services, Kitchen Services and Mortuary.

References
 Elizabeth Donkin Hospital

Psychiatric hospitals in South Africa
Hospitals in the Eastern Cape
Buildings and structures in Port Elizabeth